Mala Gora is a settlement in the hills north of the town of Kočevje in southern Slovenia. It was a village settled by Gottschee Germans. During the Second World War its original population was expelled. The area is part of the traditional region of Lower Carniola and is now included in the Southeast Slovenia Statistical Region.

Name
It is hypothesized that the name Mala Gora (literally, 'little mountain') was coined by settlers that originated from the Big Mountain chain to the west, as a contrast with the higher-elevation area they had left. The German name Malgern was then derived from the Slovene name.

History
During the 1809 Gottscheer Rebellion, a French captain named Chambelli was murdered in the village of Mala Gora while transporting tax revenues from Novo Mesto to Kočevje. In revenge, the French forces burned Kočevske Poljane and Kostel, looted the town of Kočevje between 16 and 18 October, and executed five men in Kočevje on 18 October.

Church
The local church, dedicated to Saint Nicholas, was built before 1581 and had a painted wooden roof in its nave dating to 1623. It survived the Second World War, but was demolished in 1956.

Gallery

References

External links

Mala Gora on Geopedia
Pre–World War II map of Mala Gora with oeconyms and family names

Populated places in the Municipality of Kočevje